Hassan Hameed (born 18 March 1980), commonly known as Dakey, is a Maldivian retired footballer who played as a goalkeeper. He is the goalkeeping coach for Super United Sports.

Club career
Hameed first signed for New Radiant in 1999 before joining New Lagoons in the following year. He then played for Island Football Club and Hinnavaru Hiriya Club before returning to his former club New Radiant.

Coaching career
Hameed joined the coaching staffs of New Radiant as a goalkeeper coach, following his retirement as a player. He spent four years at New Radiant, before handing over the job of training the goalkeepers of Maldives under 19 team and women's national team.

On 2013, he joined BG Sports Club and remained as the club's assistant coach and their under 21 team's coach for two years. He returned to where he started coaching; to New Radiant on 2015 season as a goalkeeper coach but also had to perform as a caretaker assistant coach for some part of the season. He was also the New Radiant academy coach in 2015.

After the 2015 season, he was handed over the job of the goalkeeper coach of Maldives.

References

External links
 BG's target to lift the trophy: Duckey Sun Online (Dhivehi)
 Will do everything to win the match Sun Online (Dhivehi)
 Victory and New are rivals. We target to win: Duckey Sun Online (Dhivehi)
https://boalha.mv/contents/feature/news/1296

1980 births
Living people
Maldivian footballers
Maldives international footballers
New Radiant S.C. players

Association football goalkeepers